The Mobile Alliance Against Child Sexual Abuse Content was founded in 2008 by an international group of mobile operators within the GSM Association  to work collectively on obstructing the use of the mobile environment by individuals or organisations wishing to consume or profit from child sexual abuse content.

While the vast majority of child sexual abuse content (child pornography) is today accessed through conventional connections to the Internet, there is a danger that broadband networks now being rolled out by mobile operators could be misused in the same way.

Goal of the Alliance
The Alliance's ultimate aim is to help stem, and ultimately reverse, the growth of non approved content around the world. Through a combination of technical measures, co-operation and information sharing, the Alliance seeks to create significant barriers to the misuse of mobile networks and services for hosting, accessing, or profiting from not approved content.

Member commitments
Members of the Alliance agree to, among other measures:
·	support and promote ‘hotlines’ or other mechanisms for customers to report child sexual abuse content discovered on the Internet or on mobile content services.
·	implement notice and take down processes to enable the removal of any child sexual abuse content posted on their own services
·	implement technical mechanisms to prevent access to websites identified by an appropriate agency as hosting child sexual abuse content

The Alliance encourages all mobile operators worldwide, regardless of access technology, to participate in the Alliance.

Founding members
The founding members of the Mobile Alliance were:
GSMA
Hutchison 3G Europe
mobilkom austria
Orange FT Group
Telecom Italia
Telefónica/02
Telenor Group
TeliaSonera
T-Mobile Group
Vodafone Group
dotMobi
NForceIT Org

See also
GSM Association
Optional Protocol to the Convention on the Rights of the Child
Internet Watch Foundation
Financial Coalition Against Child Pornography
ECPAT

References

Internet governance organizations
Mobile content
Telecommunications organizations